North Aramara is a rural locality in the Fraser Coast Region, Queensland, Australia.

History 
Musket Flat Provisional School opened on 29 February 1904. It closed briefly in 1906 as there was no accommodation available for the teacher. In 1908, it was relocated and renamed Bowling Green Provisional School. On 1 January 1909, it became Bowling Green State School. In 1940, it was renamed Aramara North State School. It was on the north-east corner of Musket Flat Road and an unnamed road going east to the Doongul Creek. The school was moved to a new site in 1949 and finally permanently closed in 1983. It was on the north-western corner of Upper Bowling Green Road and North Aramara / Musket Flat Road. As at 2023, the school buildings are still extant and the site is now the North Aramara Recreation Reserve.

Edward Nichol, timbercutter, and his cousin David Willam Boldery, teamster, both attended Bowling Green School and were killed in action in World War I. The names of these two soldiers are on what is now the North Aramara War Memorial.

Heritage listings 
Fraser Coast Regional Council has placed the following sites on its Local Heritage Register:-

 North Aramara Hall at 2 North Aramara Road North Aramara
 Aramara North School and War Memorial at Corner North Aramara and Upper Bowling Green Road, North Aramara

Education 
There are no schools in North Aramara. The nearest government primary school is Brooweena State School in neighbouring Brooweena to the south-west. The nearest government secondary school is Aldridge State High School in Maryborough to the east.

References

Further reading 

  —includes information on other schools: Brooweena, Braemar, Woocoo, Teebar East, Teebar West, Boompa, Idahlia, Dunmora, Musket Flat, Bowling Green, Aramara North, Aramara, and Gungaloon.

Fraser Coast Region
Localities in Queensland
\